Nosovskaya is a rural locality (a village) in Fedorogorskoye Rural Settlement of Shenkursky District, Arkhangelsk Oblast, Russia. The population was 3 as of 2010.

Geography 
It is located on the Kodima River.

References 

Rural localities in Shenkursky District